Miss Martian (real name: M'gann M'orzz; alias Megan Morse) is a superheroine appearing in American comic books published by DC Comics. 

Sharon Leal portrayed the character in the second season of the Arrowverse series Supergirl. Leal returned in two episodes of the third and fifth seasons and returned in the sixth season. Miss Martian was also featured in the animated series Young Justice voiced by Danica McKellar.

Publication history
Miss Martian was created by Geoff Johns and Tony Daniel and first appeared in Teen Titans #37 (2006). Miss Martian is named "Megan Morse" after former Marvel Comics editor Ben Morse's wife, Megan (Megan is a friend of Johns). Johns initially created the character when he was told by DC's editorial staff that he could not use Supergirl, who was a member of the Legion of Super-Heroes at the time.

Fictional character biography
Miss Martian is a White Martian known as M'gann M'orzz. She serves as a member of the Teen Titans during the year between the events depicted in Infinite Crisis and the "One Year Later" stories. On Earth, she simplifies her name to Megan Morse.

M'gann M'orzz was originally sent by rocket from Mars to the Vega system to escape the civil war between the Green Martians and the White Martians. To date, it is still unknown when she came to Earth from Vega.

Initially, M'gann pretended to be a Green Martian, like the Martian Manhunter, and joined the Teen Titans. After her feelings were hurt through insensitivity and misunderstanding with her teammates, M'gann left the Titans to be a hero in Australia. Though the Titans suspected she might have been a traitor, it turned out that her accuser, Bombshell, was the actual traitor. After helping the team defeat Bombshell and proving her loyalty, she was accepted as a full member of the Titans.

M'gann and Cyborg travel to Belle Reve to interrogate the depowered Bombshell. M'gann, using her telepathy on Bombshell, discovers the existence of Titans East (Bombshell is seemingly murdered by a mind-controlled Batgirl soon thereafter, but eventually recovers). M'gann fights Sun Girl, who claims to be from a future in which Martians are slaves because of something that M'gann will do (Sun Girl also claims that in the future M'gann will be her slave). Unable to convince Sun Girl to tell her what she will do in the future, M'gann dives into the ocean and then hits Sun Girl with a mass of water, dousing her flames.

The Titans Tomorrow appear with Miss Martian as a member. She has a different look, having embraced her White Martian heritage. Having changed her name to Martian Manhunter, she is killed by her present-day counterpart. As a result of this encounter, the consciousness of her future self has taken refuge in Megan's own mind. An epilogue to the "Titans of Tomorrow: Today!" storyline depicts Miss Martian eight years in the future; she colludes with Lex Luthor and Tim Drake, the Robin of the time and with whom she is having an affair, to clone several deceased Titans, including Superboy and Kid Flash.

Megan is attacked by Disruptor of the Terror Titans, whose weapons almost separate her from her future self. Megan is captured and thrown into a room with Kid Devil, who has been savagely conditioned into a mindless beast. She attempts to calm his mind with her telepathy, but a reincarnated version of Granny Goodness has found a way to inhibit her Martian abilities.

Megan finally manages to restore Eddie's rational mind, and the two escape. Back at Titans Tower, Megan implies that the encounter with Disruptor has allowed her to subdue her future self's consciousness. Her future counterpart seems still able to communicate with her, but M'gann shushes her effortlessly by the simple threat of siccing the cute puppies on her, e.g. feeding her images of cuteness and love.

Later, however, Megan begins showing signs of being unable to subdue her evil self, such as appearing before the team having chalk-white skin as opposed to her usually preferred green skin. She seems as surprised at this as the rest of the team, and later finally comes to the conclusion to leave the Titans for an unknown period of time. Before leaving, however, she says goodbye to the Titans and admits to Eddie that she will miss him the most, to which he questions if she is comparing him to the Scarecrow from The Wizard of Oz.

Teen Titans writer Sean McKeever has stated that Megan's departure from the Titans is part of a longer story he was working on and that she will return to the team at a later time.

Megan appears in the final issue of the Terror Titans miniseries, having been posing as Star-Spangled Kid in The Dark Side Club's metahuman fights. She had been using her immunity to Clock King's mind control to slowly free the other brainwashed metahumans.

Megan is briefly seen as part of an underground resistance cell in Final Crisis #5 (Dec. 2008). She rejoins the Titans in the aftermath of their failed recruitment drive, bringing new members Static and Aquagirl with her. In the same story, Megan hints that she has rid herself of her future counterpart's consciousness from her mind.

When Beast Boy returns to lead the Titans in the wake of Kid Devil's death, Megan is the only member of the team who is willing to support him. While the rest of the team is busy arguing with him, Megan is attacked and captured by a new villain known as Wyld. After a vigorous battle, Megan is rescued by her teammates.

At some point prior to this, Megan is seen operating on a solo mission where she defeats Brick after he attempts to abduct a young girl and hold her for ransom. Seconds after flooring the kidnapper, Megan is visited by Jay Garrick, who recruits her for some unknown purpose. In the finale of Justice League: Cry for Justice, it is revealed that Garrick recruited her to help interrogate Prometheus, who had destroyed Star City. When she attempts to read his mind, Megan is knocked out by specialized mental defenses Prometheus put in place after an encounter with the Martian Manhunter.

Megan later accompanies her fellow Titans to the city of Dakota to look for Static after he goes missing. After Wonder Girl, Aquagirl, and Bombshell are kidnapped as well, the remaining Titans track them to an armored bunker. Megan tries to fight off a powerful metahuman gangster named Holocaust, but he is somehow able to resist her telepathic assault and knock her unconscious. After awakening, Megan realizes that she had accidentally struck Raven with a mental barrage, which has now left her comatose. On the way back to Titans Tower, Raven is kidnapped by Wyld.

Brightest Day
During Brightest Day, Megan is asked by Batman to contact Starman after he is captured by a crazed Alan Scott. After coming aboard the Justice League Watchtower, she mentally reaches out to Starman and begins to relay information about his prison, only to transform into her White Martian form and attack the Justice League. Before Megan can injure any of her fellow heroes, she is knocked unconscious by Power Girl, who implies that she had been possessed by the Starheart, the cosmic entity that granted Alan his powers.

Around this time, the recently resurrected Martian Manhunter contacts Titans Tower to talk to Megan, and is told by Superboy that she has taken a leave of absence from the team. He heads to Australia to find Megan and see if she has any information about a string of murders that seem to have been committed by a fellow Martian, only to find her tied up and severely beaten. While tending to her, J'onn is contacted by the Entity, and Megan's wounds fully recover. She also senses that there is another Martian on Earth. When J'onn asks Megan who did this to her, Megan says she was attacked by a female Green Martian.

After a mission to rescue Raven from Wyld's dimension, Megan is left in a coma. Cyborg and a scientist named Rochelle Barnes take Megan to Cadmus Labs to find a way to help her, and Static (who had lost his powers after the battle with Wyld) comes along with her, stating that she should have a Titan by her side while she recovers. The issue ends with a note stating that the story will be resolved in a new Static solo series, which will launch sometime in 2011.

No longer a member of the Titans, Miss Martian is later attacked by a teenaged psychic named Alexander, who kidnaps her and uses her as bait to lure Supergirl into a trap. After defeating Supergirl, M'gann uses her abilities to help brainwash Blue Beetle and Robin into serving Alexander. It is later revealed, however, that Miss Martian was never under Alexander's control to begin with; she had merely pretended to be while using her telepathy to tell Supergirl her plan. Miss Martian then forcefeeds Alexander's mind with mental feedback, distracting him enough for Supergirl to subdue him.

Along with a number of other former Titans, M'gann returns to assist the team during their final battle against Superboy-Prime and the Legion of Doom. Working together with Solstice, M'gann defeats her old nemesis Sun Girl.

The New 52
In September 2011, DC carried out a revision of its superhero comic book line, including its stories and its characters' fictional histories, known as The New 52. In the revised stories, Miss Martian's first appearance is when Red Robin is shown watching a press conference where Lex Luthor shows off photographs of M'gann as part of a presentation about alien life on Earth.

DC Rebirth
DC made another revision of its superhero comic book line, known as the DC Rebirth. Miss Martian appears in the revised stories. Here, she has been assigned by Martian Manhunter as the Justice League liaison to watch over the Titans. The White Martian side of Miss Martian was eventually revealed to the Titans, as she couldn't contain her form after getting attacked by Beast Boy (who lost his self-control seemingly due to the energy of the Source Wall), when they were stranded on a strange planet. With the Titans back on earth, Batman tells Donna Troy that Martian Manhunter's actual intention to place Miss Martian on the Titans was to protect her true nature and keep her safe.

Characterization

Powers and abilities

Miss Martian possesses abilities similar to Martian Manhunter and all other Martians. She has superhuman strength and stamina comparable to that of a Kryptonian. She is invulnerable and has been shown to repel attacks from the likes of Despero. She can enhance this invulnerability by making herself super dense. This invulnerability also extends to her being able to survive in the vacuum of space. She also has the ability to shapeshift and she can use this to regenerate herself at a rapid rate. Her shapeshifting can be used at will and in an unlimited application, including adopting human or monstrous appearance, elongating her limbs, growing to immense size, altering the chemical composition of her body, etc. This also extends to her being able to expand or lengthen her limbs or to create natural body weapons. This control over her molecular structure also gives her the abilities of invisibility and intangibility.

She is a powerful psychic with major applications of this being telepathy and telekinesis. She can use the telekinesis to manipulate, move, control, levitate many objects. She can also use her telekinesis to fly. Her telepathy is one of her strongest abilities and allows her a wide variety of abilities including mind reading, communication by the mind, projecting her thoughts, creating illusions, locating other sentient beings, mental detection, mental cloak, mental scan, controlling others' minds, manipulating memory, inducing sleep, astral travel, and transferring information to people directly. Her psionic abilities can also manifest themselves in a telekinetic blast/push or a telekinetic shield. A further application of her powers is Martian vision, in which she expels energy from her eyes. Martians have nine senses compared to humans, which gives them stronger perception of the world.

As an adult in the Titans of Tomorrow... Today! storyline, M'gann's default physical form is that of a White Martian having embraced her heritage (and Martian physiology reflecting their state of mind). To compensate for her pyrophobia, adult M'Gann wears a forcefield that protects her from flame.

Weakness
Like all Martians, she can be weakened by fire. This is due to pyrophobia which all Martians suffer from, with fire being the Martian's "Achilles heel", equivalent to Kryptonians' weakness to Kryptonite. Exposure to fire typically causes her to lose control over some of her powers, which leaves her very faint and weakened. It was revealed, during the Trial By Fire storyline, that the Martian weakness to fire is an inbuilt psychosomatic effect, placed in the Martian race long ago by the Guardians of the Universe. The purpose of this was to prevent the Martians from reverting to a previous state in which they were highly aggressive, on the verge of interstellar conquest, and required flames and the psychic suffering of others to reproduce.

Other versions

Earth-16
On The New 52 DC Multiverse world of Earth-16, an alternate Miss Martian is glimpsed briefly in a swimming pool ensemble scene, although she has no dialogue within it. Earth-16 is a 'legacy'-based alternate Earth, where the Silver Age generation of metahumans have had children, or have relinquished active crimefighting to their former protégés. However, due to preprogrammed Superman robots, there is little active criminality left to fight, so metahumans undertake combat games. Whether Miss Martian is a member of the Teen Titans on this alternate Earth is unknown at present.

Tiny Titans
In the children's series Tiny Titans, Miss Martian is one of the younger toddlers and part of the "Little Tiny Titans" with Wildebeest and Jericho, often stretching her long, octopus arms to grab objects. She is often seen hugging the older Beast Boy, whom she calls "Bee Bee", due to his ability to turn into a puppy (ironically the opposite relationship of their Young Justice cartoon counterparts).

In other media

Television

 M'gann M'orzz / Miss Martian appears in Young Justice, voiced by Danica McKellar. This version is the niece of Martian Manhunter, being 48 in Earth years and 16 by Martian biological standards, has twelve sisters, and initially hid her White Martian heritage via a Green Martian form based on the protagonist of her favorite sitcom, Hello, Megan!. Throughout season one, she joins the Team, enters a relationship with teammate Superboy, meets the star of Hello, Megan!, Marie Logan, and befriends her son Garfield Logan, who M'gann later gives a blood transfusion to save his life, contributing to his becoming Beast Boy. M'gann eventually comes clean to her teammates, who accept her for who she is, with Superboy in particular revealing he always knew because of their strong telepathic link. In season two, Invasion, she has adopted Beast Boy as a foster brother following Marie's death, but became darker and more aggressive towards those she deems "bad guys", often leaving them in catatonic states. After a failed attempt to manipulate Superboy's knowledge of an argument they had over her tactics, he broke up with her, leading to her entering a new relationship with Lagoon Boy. While taking revenge on Aqualad for Artemis Crock's apparent murder, M'gann learns the pair are working undercover to infiltrate the Light and gradually softens while restoring Aqualad's mind. Guilt-ridden over her selfish motives, she breaks up with Lagoon Boy and eventually reconciles with Superboy. As of season three, Outsiders, M'gann has altered her Martian form to reflect her White Martian roots, became the leader of the Team, re-encounters her brother M'comm, and has begun living with Superboy, who goes on to propose to her. In the fourth season, Phantoms, M'gann and Superboy travel to Mars to undergo a Martian wedding, though she is forced to address unresolved issues with her estranged siblings and the pair become involved in the Legion of Super-Heroes' efforts to stop Lor-Zod from freeing his parents Dru-Zod and Ursa from the Phantom Zone. After defeating the Zods, M'gann and Superboy complete their Martian wedding before returning to Earth for an intimate earthen wedding.
 The Young Justice incarnation of Miss Martian makes a non-speaking appearance in the Teen Titans Go! episode "Let's Get Serious".
 Miss Martian appears in Supergirl, portrayed by Sharon Leal. In response to the horrors the White Martians committed against the Green Martians, this version aided the latter before fleeing to Earth, where she hid for 300 years. In the present, she encounters J'onn J'onzz, but tries to keep her distance out of guilt for what her kind did to his until she is forced to give him a blood transfusion after he is attacked by the Parasite and gradually turn him into a White Martian. Upon being confronted, M'gann offers no resistance, hoping J'onn will kill her, but he imprisons her in the Department of Extranormal Operations (DEO)'s headquarters instead. Ultimately, he forgives her for what the White Martians did before she returns to Mars and goes on to form a White Martian resistance movement against White Martian oppression.

Film
 The Young Justice incarnation of Miss Martian makes a cameo appearance in Scooby-Doo! WrestleMania Mystery.
 Miss Martian makes a cameo appearance in Teen Titans Go! To the Movies.
 Miss Martian appears in Justice League vs. the Fatal Five, voiced by Daniela Bobadilla. This version is initially an associate of the Justice League before receiving membership after helping them defeat the Fatal Five.

Video games
 Miss Martian appears as a playable character in Young Justice: Legacy, voiced again by Danica McKellar.
 Miss Martian appears as a playable character in Lego Batman 3: Beyond Gotham, voiced by Laura Bailey.
 Miss Martian appears as a playable character in Lego DC Super Villains.

Miscellaneous
 Miss Martian appears in Smallville Season 11 Special. This version was held captive by Checkmate, but bonded with scientist King Faraday, who treated her like a surrogate daughter. Over time, Miss Martian took on an appearance based on his deceased daughter and adopts the alias "Megan Morse". Following Faraday's death, Miss Martian goes on a rampage, killing those she deems "evil" until Batman and Martian Manhunter find her. Despite initial difficulties, the latter bonds with her and she becomes his protege and niece. She would later join Jay Garrick's Teen Titans and enter a relationship with Connor Kent.
 Miss Martian appears in DC Super Hero Girls, voiced by Cristina Pucelli. This version is roommates with Killer Frost, Lady Shiva, and Star Sapphire.

See also
 Martian Manhunter
 One Year Later

References

External links
 Miss Martian at the DC Database

Characters created by Geoff Johns
Characters created by Tony S. Daniel
Comics characters introduced in 2006
DC Comics aliens
DC Comics characters who are shapeshifters
DC Comics characters who can move at superhuman speeds
DC Comics characters with accelerated healing
 DC Comics characters with superhuman senses
DC Comics characters with superhuman strength 
DC Comics characters who have mental powers
DC Comics extraterrestrial superheroes
DC Comics female superheroes 
DC Comics telekinetics
DC Comics telepaths
DC Comics sidekicks 
DC Comics child superheroes
Fictional characters who can turn intangible
Fictional characters who can turn invisible
Fictional characters with X-ray vision
Fictional characters who can stretch themselves
Fictional characters with density control abilities
Fictional characters with energy-manipulation abilities
Fictional characters with fire or heat abilities 
Fictional characters with slowed ageing
Fictional Martians 
Fictional empaths
Fictional illusionists
Fictional school counselors
Teenage characters in comics